Erik Magnus Niva, (born 28 November 1978) is a Swedish sportsjournalist for Sportbladet. He also is a studio expert for VIASAT Fotboll.

Career
Nivas first journalistic work was to cover the sled dog races for the Swedish championships for Norrbottens-Kuriren. His career as a football  journalist started for the football magazine FourFourTwo in London. He studied journalism at Umeå University and also at Mitthögskolan and in 2003 he started working for Sportbladet. 

In 2008, Niva published the book Den nya världsfotbollen, in 2010 he published the book Liven längs linjen.
Since 2010, Niva works for VIASAT Fotboll and is a studio expert for football matches such as in the Premier League.

In 2016, Niva participated in the SVT show På spåret in team with Charlotte Gyllenhammar.

In 2001, Niva participated in the first season of the reality series The Farm which was broadcast on TV4.

In 2019, Niva started the swedish football-history podcast ”When we were kings” together with Håkan Andreasson.

Bibliography 
 Den nya världsfotbollen – 2008
 Liven längs linjen – 2010
 Utväg: Fotboll – 2014
 Känner ni vibbarna? : fotbollen och det nya Sverige - 2016

References

External links 

Living people
1979 births